Eduard Stihivinson Zea Chávez (born 19 January 1990) is a Colombian footballer who most recently played for PS Kemi.

Career
Born in Quibdó, Chocó, Zea began playing football as a central defender with Deportes Quindío. After joining the senior side, he spent much of his early years going on loan to América de Cali and La Equidad to get more playing opportunities. In 2012, he returned to Deportes Quindio, where he broke into the first team during the 2013 season.

Zea played for Colombia at the 2007 FIFA U-17 World Cup finals in South Korea.

References

External links 

1990 births
Living people
Colombian footballers
Deportes Quindío footballers
América de Cali footballers
La Equidad footballers
Expatriate soccer players in the United States
San Antonio Scorpions players
Phoenix Rising FC players
Colombian expatriate footballers
USL Championship players
Association football defenders
People from Quibdó
Sportspeople from Chocó Department